The 1909 Chicago Cubs season was the 38th season of the Chicago Cubs franchise, the 34th in the National League and the 17th at West Side Park. The Cubs won 104 games but finished second in the National League, 6½ games behind the Pittsburgh Pirates. The Cubs had won the pennant the previous three years and would win it again in 1910. Of their 104 victories, 97 were wins for a Cubs starting pitcher; this was the most wins in a season by the starting staff of any major league team from 1908 to the present day. The 104 wins was the most by any team in Major League Baseball history by a team that failed to finish first—a record that would be unbroken for more than a century. The record was equaled by the 1942 Brooklyn Dodgers and eventually broken by the 2021 Dodgers, who won 106 games but finished a game behind the San Francisco Giants in the NL West.

The legendary infield of Joe Tinker, Johnny Evers, Frank Chance, and Harry Steinfeldt was still intact, but it was the pitching staff that excelled. The Cubs pitchers had a collective earned run average of 1.75, a microscopic figure even for the dead-ball era. Three Finger Brown was one of the top two pitchers in the league (with Christy Mathewson) again, going 27–9 with a 1.31 ERA.

Offseason 
 February 18, 1909: Doc Marshall was purchased from the Cubs by the Brooklyn Superbas.

Regular season

Season standings

Record vs. opponents

Roster

Player stats

Batting

Starters by position 
Note: Pos = Position; G = Games played; AB = At bats; H = Hits; Avg. = Batting average; HR = Home runs; RBI = Runs batted in

Other batters 
Note: G = Games played; AB = At bats; H = Hits; Avg. = Batting average; HR = Home runs; RBI = Runs batted in

Pitching

Starting pitchers 
Note: G = Games pitched; IP = Innings pitched; W = Wins; L = Losses; ERA = Earned run average; SO = Strikeouts

Other pitchers 
Note: G = Games pitched; IP = Innings pitched; W = Wins; L = Losses; ERA = Earned run average; SO = Strikeouts

Relief pitchers 
Note: G = Games pitched; W = Wins; L = Losses; SV = Saves; ERA = Earned run average; SO = Strikeouts

Awards and honors

League top five finishers 
Mordecai Brown
 NL leader in wins (27)
 #2 in NL in ERA (1.31)
 #4 in NL in strikeouts (172)

Orval Overall
 MLB leader in strikeouts (205)
 #3 in NL in ERA (1.42)

Notes

References 
1909 Chicago Cubs season at Baseball Reference

Chicago Cubs seasons
Chicago Cubs season
Chicago Cubs